Jim Brandenburg may refer to:
 Jim Brandenburg (photographer)
 Jim Brandenburg (basketball)